Four UN Security Council Resolutions have been passed during the Nagorno-Karabakh conflict.  These resolutions have not invoked Chapter VII of the United Nations Charter.

See also 
 2020 Nagorno-Karabakh war
 Anti-Armenian sentiment
 Anti-Azerbaijani sentiment
 Madrid Principles
 First Nagorno-Karabakh War

Nagorno-Karabakh conflict
Nagorno-Karabakh conflict